Madhie is an Indian film cinematographer. Former assistant of noted cinematographer S. Saravanan, he has notably worked in films such as Veyil, Paiyaa, Pandianadu, Mirchi, Srimanthudu and Ghazi.

Early life
Madhie is an Indian cinematographer born in 1971 at Thirutharaipoondi. He has ten siblings — five elder and two younger brothers and two sisters — with one of them being Piraisoodan, poet and lyricist, who also worked in the Tamil film industry. Madhie has earned a degree in mathematics and wanted to become a restaurateur.

Career 
As a devoted cinematographer, he has worked in over 25 films and has a tremendous experience of more than 30 years in this industry. As a cinematographer he strongly believes, “Cinematography is not just about my talent in executing the techniques to perfection. Its about connecting with the audience’s mind to create an impact with regard to the story.” His experience has taught him that acclimatizing to the minds of movie lovers and feasting them with visual treats is highly required to engulf their hearts and create a lasting impression. He is notable for Veyil, Shaithan, Paiya, Mirchi, Srimanthudu, The Ghazi Attack and Saaho.

Initially, he started his career as an associate cinematographer to Mr. S. Saravanan, a notable cinematographer, and worked in around 7 films along with him. In 2002, he was introduced as an individual cinematographer through the movie Punnagai Desam. But the turning point of his career was in 2006, when his movie Veyil, directed by Mr. Vasanthabalan and produced by Mr. Shankar, released and was highly praised for its cinematography. Following consecutive successes and box office hits in Kollywood, he set foot in the Bollywood and the Tollywood industry and remained successful in continuing his victory stride. He received an opportunity to work in one of India’s highest budgeted films, Saaho which released multilingually in 2019. In Saaho, his exposure in the field increased when he got to work with many notable Hollywood technicians and used numerous hi-tech equipments. Currently he is working in the Tollywood industry with actor Mahesh Babu in Sarkaru Vaari Patta, produced by Mythri Movie Makers and also in Rowdy Boys alongside producer Dil Raju. He has also paired up with one of the greatest directors in Tollywood who is ‘Trivikram’ and starring Mahesh Babu and Pooja Hegde.

Filmography

References

External links
 

Cinematographers from Tamil Nadu
Tamil film cinematographers
Living people
Indian Tamil people
People from Tiruvarur district
1971 births